Gonchigiin Chalkhaasüren is a Mongolian chess player and Mongolian Chess Championship winner (1961). He was born in 1927 in Khalzan, Sükhbaatar.

Biography
In the 1960s Gonchigiin Chalkhaasüren was one of Mongolia's leading chess players. In 1961, he won the Mongolian Chess Championship.

Gonchigiin Chalkhaasüren played for Mongolia in the Chess Olympiads:
 In 1960, at third board in the 14th Chess Olympiad in Leipzig (+4, =7, -5),
 In 1962, at fourth board in the 15th Chess Olympiad in Varna (+2, =9, -6),
 In 1964, at first reserve board in the 16th Chess Olympiad in Tel Aviv (+3, =3, -6),
 In 1966, at second reserve board in the 17th Chess Olympiad in Havana (+3, =3, -3).

Gonchigiin Chalkhaasüren played for Mongolia in the World Student Team Chess Championships:
 In 1959, at fourth board in the 6th World Student Team Chess Championship in Budapest (+6, =2, -5),
 In 1960, at third board in the 7th World Student Team Chess Championship in Leningrad (+1, =4, -6).

References

External links

Gonchigiin Chalkhaasüren chess games at 365chess.com

1927 births
Living people
People from Sükhbaatar Province
Mongolian chess players
Chess Olympiad competitors
20th-century chess players